Dimminsdale is a 37 hectare geological biological and Site of Special Scientific Interest partly in Derbyshire and partly in Leicestershire. It is located east of Calke in Derbyshire. It is a Geological Conservation Review site, and a area of 23.5 hectares is owned by Severn Trent Water and managed by the Leicestershire and Rutland Wildlife Trust.

Dimminsdale has semi-natural woodland and one of the largest areas of unimproved acidic grassland in the county. Earl Ferrers' lead mine, which is located on the site, has a unique and complex mixture of minerals such as galena and zinc blende; their genesis is little understood and they provide great potential for research.

There is public access to footpaths on the nature reserve part of the site.

References

Sites of Special Scientific Interest in Leicestershire
Sites of Special Scientific Interest in Derbyshire
Geological Conservation Review sites
Leicestershire and Rutland Wildlife Trust